Dedication is the third studio album by American rapper Chief Keef. It was released on November 30, 2017, by RBC Records, Glo Gang & eOne. It contains features from Tadoe, A Boogie wit da Hoodie, and Lil Yachty. The album debuted at number 97 on the Billboard 200.

Singles 
Two music videos were filmed, for the mixtape's singles "Text" and "Mailbox". Both were directed by J R Saint and ColourfulMula.

Track listing

Personnel 
Technical
 Slavic Livins – mix engineer

Notes
 "Get It" contains a sample of "Real Sisters" by Future
 "Negro" contains a sample of "Living All Alone" by Phyllis Hyman
 "Kills" was later interpolated in "Praise the Lord (Da Shine)" by A$AP Rocky & Skepta

Charts

References 

2017 albums
Chief Keef albums